Connor Questa discography or its inception, originally called as Marilina Connor Questa; a group of originating alternative rock of Buenos Aires, active between 2010 and 2015, Argentina has an EP, two albums of study, nine singles and seven official promotional video.

Studio albums

Extended plays

Singles

Videography

References 

Discographies of Argentine artists